The Kumite 1 League (K1L) is a mixed martial arts league and martial arts promotion, based in Mumbai, India. The league is supported by the World Kickboxing Network and backed by Toyam Industries. Kumite 1 League debuted its inaugural season on 28 September 2018 in Mumbai and Mike Tyson was appointed as the brand ambassador of the event.

History 
Kumite 1 League was founded by Mohamedali Budhwani in 2017, with the purpose to promote and popularise the sport of Mixed Martial Arts           in India.

Events 
Kumite 1 League 1.0 was the introductory event held at the National Sports Club of India (NSCI) Dome, Mumbai on 28 September 2018, in the presence of brand ambassador Mike Tyson. The event was attended by international sports and entertainment personalities from India. The event was broadcast in India on Sony ESPN, Sony ESPN HD and Sony Liv and it was beamed across more than 80 countries.

Bappi Lahiri composed a special jingle for Mike Tyson during his visit to India. Music composer Asif Panjwani created the theme music for Kumite 1 League. The MMA champion Nelson Paes won the Kumite 1 League's championship. The inaugural season was won by Nelson Paes.

Kumite 1 Warrior Hunt 
Toyam Industries Limited has launched Kumite 1 Warrior Hunt, which is India's first-ever MMA Talent Hunt & Sports Reality Show streaming as a Web Series on MX Player. Kumite 1 Warrior Hunt is seeking two of the top mixed martial arts (MMA) one male and one female champion athlete.

See also 
 Mixed martial arts

References

External links
 Official Website

Mixed martial arts organizations
Martial arts in India
Sports organisations of India
Organisations based in Mumbai
2017 establishments in Maharashtra
Sports organizations established in 2017